The 1927 Notre Dame Fighting Irish football team represented the University of Notre Dame during the 1927 college football season. Although most selectors have named either Illinois or Georgia as the 1927 national champion, Notre Dame was retroactively named as the national champion by one selector, the Houlgate System. The team was ranked No. 4 in the nation in the Dickinson System ratings released in December 1927.

Schedule

References

Notre Dame
Notre Dame Fighting Irish football seasons
Notre Dame Fighting Irish football